Radio Hekaphon was the first radio broadcasting station in Austria.

It transmitted as pirate radio station from April 1, 1923, and ceased broadcasting in 1924, after the first license was granted to RAVAG.

Sources 
 Haimo Godler: Vom Dampfradio zur Klangtapete: Beiträge zu 80 Jahren Hörfunk in Österreich. Böhlau Verlag, Wien 2004.
 Peter Knezu: Radio HEKAPHONE - The first pirate broadcast transmitter in Austria. In: Second IEEE Region 8 Conference on the History of Telecommunications (HISTELCON). 

Defunct radio stations in Austria
Radio stations established in 1923
Radio stations disestablished in 1924
1923 establishments in Austria
1924 disestablishments in Austria